Margarita Volkovinskaya (born September 3, 1990), known professionally as Rita Volk, is an Uzbekistani–American actress. She is known for her role as Amy Raudenfeld in the MTV romantic comedy series Faking It.

Early life 
Volk was born in Tashkent, Uzbek SSR, Soviet Union. She moved with her family to San Francisco when she was six years old. She was approached by a modeling scout, and after auditioning for commercials Volk decided that she wanted to continue pursuing acting.

Volk attended Lowell High School in San Francisco. Through high school, she acted in school plays and further explored her burgeoning love for film which she claims helped her and her family acclimatize to American English and culture. In 2005, she won the SFUSD High School Poet Laureate award. After high school, Volk attended Duke University, where she graduated with a degree in psychology on a pre-medical track. During college, she acted in student films and was a member of Inside Joke, Duke's sketch comedy troupe.

Career 
In 2013 Volk was cast in the pilot for the MTV comedy series Faking It, playing Amy, one of the series' lead roles; MTV ordered Faking It to series in October 2013. For Faking It, Volk originally tried out for the role of co-lead Karma, not Amy. In 2015 she joined the cast of the dramedy film Almost Friends. She also appears in the John Carpenter-directed 2017 music video for the theme to his earlier film, Christine.

Filmography

Film

Television

Music videos

References

External links 

MTV Faking It

Living people
1990 births
Actresses from San Francisco
American television actresses
American film actresses
American people of Uzbekistani descent
American people of Russian descent
Uzbekistani people of Russian descent
Duke University Trinity College of Arts and Sciences alumni
Lowell High School (San Francisco) alumni
Uzbekistani emigrants to the United States
21st-century American actresses